Käthe Kollwitz Museum may refer to:

Käthe Kollwitz Museum (Berlin)
Käthe Kollwitz Museum (Cologne)
Käthe Kollwitz House (Moritzburg)